"The Last Defender of Camelot" is the second segment of the twenty-fourth episode of the first season (1985–86) of the American television series The Twilight Zone. It was based on the short story of the same name written by Roger Zelazny, and was adapted by George R. R. Martin. Deriving from Arthurian legend, the story follows the sole three survivors of the Battle of Camlann - Lancelot, Morgan le Fay, and Merlin - as they are reunited in the 20th century in a final battle over the fate of England.

Plot
An elderly gentleman is accosted by three thugs. He fends them off and forces one of the thugs, Tom, to disclose that a woman paid them to bring him to her. At the old man's command, Tom takes him to see the woman. The woman recognizes the elderly man as Sir Lancelot and he recognizes her as Morgan le Fay. According to Morgan, Lancelot's decision to take a vacation to Cornwall was a compulsion directed by Merlin, who sleeps in a cave in Cornwall, and is responsible for Lancelot's impossible longevity. Despite her warnings that Merlin is not to be trusted, Lancelot is determined to go to Merlin and take Tom with him. Morgan casts a spell that sends Lancelot and Tom to the cave entrance. Lancelot enters alone, finds Merlin, and revives him with a nearby elixir.

Merlin questions Lancelot about the state of the world and insists they work together to place a king of Merlin's choosing on the throne. Lancelot explains that the world has changed; kings are mere figureheads and the people elect their own leaders. He also explains the dangers of modern war. Merlin is unconvinced. He animates a suit of armor to make a champion. As they exit the cave, the setting has changed. Merlin reveals they are at Stonehenge, and that Lancelot's decision to bring Tom was another magical compulsion from him; he intends to sacrifice Tom to completely restore his magic. Lancelot objects, and demands armor and weapons to challenge the hollow knight for Tom's life. Merlin believes Lancelot will be unable to don the armor without Merlin's gift of longevity, but Lancelot secretly drank the rest of the elixir used to revive Merlin. Lancelot engages the hollow knight and gains the upper hand. Merlin attempts to interfere. Morgan arrives and attacks Merlin magically. Merlin turns on her, and Morgan is mortally wounded. Lancelot defeats the hollow knight and breaks Merlin's staff. Powerless without his staff, Merlin succumbs to his advanced years and dies.

Morgan le Fay instructs Lancelot and Tom to take a right at the fork to return to London, then expires in Lancelot's arms. As he and Tom approach the fork, Lancelot sees a castle in the distance and is so enraptured by it that he doesn't hear Tom's warning that he is going the wrong way. Tom turns away from London and follows Lancelot.

External links
 
  Postcards from the Zone episode The Last Defender of Camelot

1986 American television episodes
The Twilight Zone (1985 TV series season 1) episodes
Television episodes written by George R. R. Martin
Television episodes about immortality
Fiction set in 1986
Television shows based on short fiction
Works based on Merlin

fr:Le Dernier Chevalier